Purshia mexicana is a species of perennial flowering small tree in the rose family known by the common name Mexican cliffrose. It is native to western-northern Mexico, the region of the Sierra Madre Occidental cordillera.

Purshia stansburyana, native to the southwestern United States, has sometimes been included within P. mexicana.

In its mostly mountainous, or higher elevation habitat, it grows in woodlands, desert, and plateau habitat.

Stenophyllanin A, a tannin, can be found in P. mexicana.

Distribution
The range of Mexican cliffrose is from the western Mexican Plateau in the south, and the southern Sierra Madre Occidental cordillera north to a small region of northwest Sonora; it has a continuous range in the cordillera from Chihuahua south through Durango and Zacatecas, all mostly north of the Trans-Mexican Volcanic Belt, though a few scattered locales do occur in the belt.

Uses
The plant is browsed by deer, cattle, and sheep, and is particularly important to these species during the winter.

Native Americans made ropes and clothing from the bark, and fashioned arrow shafts from the stems.

References

Further reading

External links
UC CalPhotos gallery of Purshia mexicana

mexicana
North American desert flora
Flora of the California desert regions
Flora of Chihuahua (state)
Flora of Coahuila
Flora of Guanajuato
Flora of Hidalgo (state)
Flora of Sonora
Flora of Zacatecas
Flora of the Chihuahuan Desert
Flora of the Sonoran Deserts
Flora of the Mexican Plateau
Natural history of the Mojave Desert
Flora of the Sierra Madre Occidental
Flora without expected TNC conservation status